No Way Back (Swedish: Ingen väg tillbaka) is a 1947 Swedish drama film directed by and starring Edvin Adolphson and also featuring Anita Björk, Olof Bergström and Gaby Stenberg. It was shot at the Centrumateljéerna Studios in Stockholm. The film's sets were designed by the art director Arthur Spjuth.

Synopsis
Hugo Henriksen, a widowed businessman in wartime occupied Copenhagen is about to be granted a directorship and is persuaded by his daughter Evelyn to go out and celebrate. During an air raid a series of events lead to him accidentally killing a prostitute who had accosted him. He is witness leaving the vicinity by Preben, a young man who hopes to marry Evelyn. Henriksen leaves the city to avoid the hue and cry, and briefly enjoys some days of happiness with a woman Inger who he meets. However, he abruptly leaves her and returns to Copenhagen.

He discovers Preben is mixed up with the anti-German resistance movement. He eventually also sacrifices himself in the cause, as he is already a doomed man.

Cast
 Edvin Adolphson as 	Hugo Henriksen
 Anita Björk as 	Evelyn
 Olof Bergström as Preben
 Gaby Stenberg as Inger
 Naemi Briese as 	Rosa
 Arnold Sjöstrand as 	Rasmussen
 Hugo Björne as 	Jespeersen
 Julie Bernby as 	Prostitute
 Nancy Dalunde as 	Prostitute
 Carl Hagman as 	Beer café host
 Aurore Palmgren as 	Mrs. Jörgensen
 Willy Peters as 	Benito

References

Bibliography 
 Qvist, Per Olov & von Bagh, Peter. Guide to the Cinema of Sweden and Finland. Greenwood Publishing Group, 2000.

External links 
 

1947 films
Swedish drama films
1947 drama films
1940s Swedish-language films
Films directed by Edvin Adolphson
Swedish black-and-white films
Films set in Copenhagen
Swedish World War II films
1940s Swedish films